The PGA Professional Championship is a golf tournament run by The PGA for club professionals. It was first played in 1973 as the MacGregor PGA Club Professionals' Championship. The leading nine players in the event became the Great Britain and Ireland team for the first Diamondhead Cup, the forerunner of the PGA Cup, played against a United States team at Pinehurst later in the year.

Winners

The 1991 event was won by Brett Upper, an American, with a score of 285. Upper received the first prize money but was not eligible to win the title.

Source:

References

Golf tournaments in the United Kingdom
Golf tournaments in the Republic of Ireland
Recurring sporting events established in 1973